Two Eyes Staring originally titled Zwart Water is a 2010 Dutch horror film directed by Elbert van Strien and co-written by van Strien and Paulo van Vliet.

Plot
A horror tale centered on the friendship between a young girl and the ghost of her mother's twin.

Cast
 Hadewych Minis as Christine / Karen

Remake
A remake is announced to be directed by Scott Derrickson and starring Charlize Theron.

References

External links
 

2010 horror films
2010 films
Dutch horror films
2010s Dutch-language films